Engineering Campus Cricket Ground, also known as Pulchowk Cricket Ground or Lalitpur Cricket Ground is a cricket ground in Lalitpur, Nepal.

Major Events
 1998 ACC Trophy
 2005 ACC Under-19 Cup
 2009 ACC Under-17 Cup
 2010 ICC World Cricket League Division Five
 2011 ACC Twenty20 Cup
 2013 ACC Twenty20 Cup

See also
List of cricket grounds in Nepal

External links 

Cricket grounds in Nepal
Sports venues in Nepal